Datuk Abdul Rashid bin Mohd Sidek  (born 8 July 1968) is a Malaysian former badminton player and coach.

Personal life 
He is the youngest of the famous five Sidek brothers. Rashid and his siblings gained exposure to badminton from their father, Mohd Sidek, a former player turned coach. Under the guidance of their father, Rashid and the rest of his siblings were trained to be champions from an early age. Additionally, Rashid was also an alumnus of Victoria Institution from the 1980–1985 batch.

Career 
After completing his Sijil Penilaian Menengah (SPM) exam, he was injected into the Project 1988/90 squad with the aim of regaining the Thomas Cup. In the 1990 Thomas Cup, Rashid played well but Malaysia lost the finals to China 1–4.

He won the Malaysian Open title for three consecutive years in 1990, 1991, and 1992. As a result, he became known by many as “jaguh kampung” (literally, "local hero"). In the Thomas Cup final in 1992, he beat Ardy Wiranata to give Malaysia the first point in a dramatic 3-2 win over rivals Indonesia - the first championship won by Malaysia in 25 years, and the last to this day.

Over the next three years, Rashid's performance declined, but he bounced back in 1996, when he won the Asia Cup and German Open, then reached the finals of the All England before losing to Paul-Erik Hoyer Larsen from Denmark. His ranking rose to among the top three in the world. He won the bronze medal at the 1996 Atlanta Olympics, beating the top seed, Joko Suprianto of Indonesia en route to the semi-finals, where he was beaten by Dong Jiong. However, he beat Indonesia's 1995 world champion, Heryanto Arbi, 5-15, 15-11, 15-6 in the third place playoff.

In 1997, Rashid reached the top of the world ranking. He later began to make way for new generation players like Wong Choong Hann, Yong Hock Kin and Roslin Hashim.

He retired in 2000, when aged only 32, to make way for younger and new generation players.

Coaching 
Upon his retirement, Rashid was appointed as national coach by the Badminton Association of Malaysia from 2003 until 2015. He became instrumental for the success of the new generation badminton players such as Daren Liew and Chong Wei Feng. Apart from that, he was a coach for Nusa Mahsuri, the first professional badminton club in Malaysia from 1996 to 2002. Currently, he acts as the advisor for the club which he had set up with his brother, Jalani.

He also became national para-badminton coach, serving as Cheah Liek Hou's coach who won the first ever gold medal in para-badminton at 2020 Summer Paralympics in Tokyo.

Achievements

Olympic Games 
Men's singles

World Cup 
Men's singles

Asian Games 
Men's singles

Asian Championships 
Men's singles

Asian Cup 
Men's singles

Southeast Asian Games 
Men's singles

Commonwealth Games 
Men's singles

Men's doubles

IBF World Grand Prix 
The World Badminton Grand Prix sanctioned by International Badminton Federation (IBF) from 1983 to 2006.

Men's singles

Men's doubles

IBF International 
Men's singles

Filmography

Film

Honours

Honours of Malaysia 
  :
  Herald of the Order of Loyalty to the Royal Family of Malaysia (B.S.D.) (1988)
  Medalist of the Order of the Defender of the Realm (P.P.N.) (1990)
  Officer of the Order of the Defender of the Realm (K.M.N.) (1992)
  :
  Knight Commander of the Order of the Territorial Crown (PMW) – Datuk (2021)

See also 
 Misbun Sidek
 Razif Sidek
 Jalani Sidek
 Rahman Sidek

References 

1968 births
Living people
People from Selangor
Malaysian Muslims
Malaysian people of Malay descent
Malaysian male badminton players
Badminton players at the 1992 Summer Olympics
Badminton players at the 1996 Summer Olympics
Olympic badminton players of Malaysia
Olympic bronze medalists for Malaysia
Olympic medalists in badminton
Medalists at the 1996 Summer Olympics
Badminton players at the 1990 Commonwealth Games
Badminton players at the 1994 Commonwealth Games
Commonwealth Games gold medallists for Malaysia
Commonwealth Games silver medallists for Malaysia
Commonwealth Games medallists in badminton
Badminton players at the 1986 Asian Games
Badminton players at the 1990 Asian Games
Asian Games silver medalists for Malaysia
Asian Games bronze medalists for Malaysia
Asian Games medalists in badminton
Medalists at the 1990 Asian Games
Competitors at the 1987 Southeast Asian Games
Competitors at the 1989 Southeast Asian Games
Competitors at the 1991 Southeast Asian Games
Competitors at the 1995 Southeast Asian Games
Southeast Asian Games gold medalists for Malaysia
Southeast Asian Games silver medalists for Malaysia
Southeast Asian Games bronze medalists for Malaysia
Southeast Asian Games medalists in badminton
World No. 1 badminton players
Badminton coaches
Medallists of the Order of the Defender of the Realm
Heralds of the Order of Loyalty to the Royal Family of Malaysia
Officers of the Order of the Defender of the Realm
Medallists at the 1990 Commonwealth Games
Medallists at the 1994 Commonwealth Games